Chelsie Kay Hightower (born July 21, 1989) is a ballroom dancer. She is known for being a regular dance partner, trainer and choreographer on the ABC competition show Dancing with the Stars, on which she was a professional from Season 8 to 15, excluding Season 13.

Biography
Chelsie Kay Hightower was born in Las Vegas, Nevada, and raised in Orem, Utah with her twin brother and four older brothers until her mother and father divorced in 2006. She started dancing when she was nine years old and received conventional training from the age of 14. She has been trained in ballroom, jazz, ballet, and hip-hop. Hightower has performed in musical theaters across the United States and won her first national title when she was 11. She was a U.S. Worlds finalist in 2005, and competed on Team USA during the British Open in Blackpool, England. She graduated from Timpanogos High School, then attended Utah Valley University.

So You Think You Can Dance
At age 18, she made her television debut on season four of So You Think You Can Dance. She is remembered for her Emmy nominated performances with Mark Kanemura to a revision of "Bleeding Love" by Leona Lewis choreographed by Nappytabs and with Joshua Allen to "A Los Amigos" choreographed by Dmitry Chaplin. She was eliminated from the U.S. reality TV show on July 31, 2008, after making it to the top six. Hightower was part of one of the two couples who avoided being in the bottom 3 couples in Season 4. She returned in season eight as an All-Star and in season 10 as a choreographer and All-Star.

So You Think You Can Dance performances

Dancing with the Stars
Hightower joined the season eight cast of Dancing with the Stars as a professional dancer, and was partnered with Ty Murray, a nine-time World Champion rodeo cowboy. On May 12, 2009, she and Murray were eliminated from the competition with a 4th-place finish. This is Hightower's best finish to date. Her partner for season nine was professional snowboarder Louie Vito. They were eliminated in week six of the competition, and came in eighth place. For season ten she was partnered with The Bachelor star Jake Pavelka. They were voted off in week six of the competition, and came in seventh place. She was paired with Michael Bolton in season 11. The couple were eliminated in week two. For season 12 she was partnered with rapper and actor Romeo Miller. They were eliminated in week eight of the competition, and came in fifth place. She was not on season 13 (2011), but returned in season 14 (2012) partnered with Disney Channel star Roshon Fegan. The couple was eliminated on week eight, finishing in sixth place. Hightower earned her highest score and her best average with any partner with Fegan earning 29/30 for their Foxtrot and earning an average of 25.7. For season 15 (the first "all-stars" season), she was partnered with season five winner Hélio Castroneves. They were voted off during a double elimination in week three and  finished in 10th place.

Hightower made an appearance in Sports Illustrated Swimsuit Winter 2010 edition (pages 152 and 153) along with three other couples from Dancing with the Stars. On July 8, 2010, she received an Emmy nomination for the "Paso doble/Malagueña" dance that she and Derek Hough performed and co-choreographed for season ten.

Hightower has performed with singer-songwriter Jewel (Ty Murray's wife) in concert on Jewel's hit "Hands."

Dancing With the Stars performances
Chelsie's average score from all her partners is 21.03 points.

Season 8 with Ty Murray (average: 22.4)

Season 9 with Louie Vito (average: 19.5)

Due to Len Goodman's absence in week two, the 7 was awarded by stand-in guest judge Baz Luhrmann.

Season 10 with Jake Pavelka (average: 20.4)

Season 11 with Michael Bolton (average: 14.0)

Season 12 with Romeo Miller (average: 23.6)

Scores for weeks 1 & 2 were combined and first results were revealed on March 29, 2011
Week seven guest judge Donnie Burns score is before Carrie Ann's
Average score does not include guest judge's score on week seven

Season 14 with Roshon Fegan (average: 25.7)

Average score does not include marathon dance in week six

Season 15 with Hélio Castroneves (average: 23.3)

Other dance work
From November 1, 2014, through April 19, 2015, Hightower performed with Dancing Pros Live, a touring show in which five dance couples compete and then the audience picks the winner. She was joined on the 50+ city tour by fellow Dancing with the Stars alumni, Edyta Śliwińska and Karina Smirnoff who acted as judges.

Other dance achievements
2005: U.S. Representative to the Worlds 
2005: U.S. National Standard Finalist  
2005: 10 Dance National Youth Champion
2006: International Latin Finalist

References

External links

 

1989 births
American ballroom dancers
Living people
People from the Las Vegas Valley
So You Think You Can Dance (American TV series) contestants
Utah Valley University alumni
21st-century American dancers